Teall Island is a high ridgelike island which rises above the Ross Ice Shelf at the west side of the mouth of Skelton Inlet. This may be the feature actually sighted and named Cape Teall by the Discovery expedition (1901–04). It was first mapped as an island by the New Zealand party of the Commonwealth Trans-Antarctic Expedition (1956–58) and named in association with nearby Cape Teall.

See also 
 List of antarctic and sub-antarctic islands

Islands of the Ross Dependency
Hillary Coast